Newport Suite is an album recorded by Canadian jazz trumpeter Maynard Ferguson featuring tracks recorded in 1960 and originally released on the Roulette label.

Reception

Allmusic reviewer Ken Dryden described it as "one of the trumpeter's very best LPs" and states "Maynard Ferguson's bands of the early '60s produced many memorable albums, including this studio effort".

Track listing
 "Jazz Bary" (Willie Maiden) - 4:25
 "Foxy" (Slide Hampton) - 5:10
 "Newport" (Hampton) - 9:32
 "Got the Spirit" (Hampton) - 3:50
 "Sometimes I Feel Like a Motherless Child" (Traditional) - 2:54
 "Ol' Man River" (Jerome Kern, Oscar Hammerstein II) - 6:58
 "Three More Foxes" (Maiden) - 8:00

Personnel 
Maynard Ferguson - trumpet, valve trombone, baritone horn
Don Ellis, Augustino 'Chet' Ferretti, Rick Kiefer - trumpet
Charles Greenlee, Mike Zagatini - trombone
Jimmy Ford - alto saxophone
Joe Farrell, Willie Maiden - tenor saxophone
Frank Hittner - baritone saxophone
Jaki Byard - piano 
Aubrey Tosin - bass  
Stu Martin - drums
Slide Hampton, Willie Maiden - arranger

References 

1960 albums
Maynard Ferguson albums
Roulette Records albums
Albums produced by Teddy Reig
Albums arranged by Slide Hampton